The ectocochleate (externally shelled) cephalopods are the oldest known representatives of their class, dating back to the Cambrian period. Their aragonitic shells are not prone to fossilisation. They contain the modern Nautilus and many fossil forms including the ancient Ellesmerocerida and the ammonoids.

References

Prehistoric cephalopod taxonomy